Asia Ray Smith (born December 7, 1988) is an American actress. She is best known for her role as Sierra Hoffman on The Young and the Restless.

Early life
She is the daughter of The Young and the Restless'''s former Head Writer John F. Smith. She attended Punahou School on the island of Oahu in Hawaii.

Filmography
 2003-06: The Young and the Restless as Sierra Hoffman (Role: February 14, 2003 – February 23, 2006)
 2010: Change'' as Student Speaker (Post-Pro)

References

External links

Living people
American soap opera actresses
Actresses from Hawaii
1988 births
Place of birth missing (living people)
21st-century American women